Ceroglossus darwini is a species of beetle in the family Carabidae. Eight subspecies are currently recognized.

References

Carabinae